In geometry, a set  is defined to be orthogonally convex if, for every line  that is parallel to one of standard basis vectors, the intersection of  with  is empty, a point, or a single segment. The term "orthogonal" refers to corresponding Cartesian basis and coordinates in Euclidean space, where different basis vectors are perpendicular, as well as corresponding lines. Unlike ordinary convex sets, an orthogonally convex set is not necessarily connected.

Orthogonal convexity restricts the lines for which this property is required to hold, so every convex set is orthogonally convex but not vice versa. For the same reason, the orthogonal convex hull itself is a subset of the convex hull of the same point set.

The orthogonal convex hull is also known as the rectilinear convex hull, or, in two dimensions, the - convex hull.

Example
The figure shows a set of 16 points in the plane and the orthogonal convex hull of these points. As can be seen in the figure, the orthogonal convex hull is a polygon with some degenerate edges connecting extreme vertices in each coordinate direction. For a discrete point set such as this one, all orthogonal convex hull edges are horizontal or vertical. In this example, the orthogonal convex hull is connected.

Alternative definitions 

In contrast with the classical convexity where there exist several equivalent definitions of the convex hull, definitions of the orthogonal convex hull made by analogy to those of the convex hull result in different geometric objects. So far, researchers have explored the following four definitions of the orthogonal convex hull of a set :

Maximal definition: The definition described in the introduction of this article. It is based on the Maxima of a point set.

In the figures on the right, the top figure shows a set of six points in the plane. The classical orthogonal convex hull of the point set is the point set itself. From top to bottom, the second to the fourth figures show respectively, the maximal, the connected, and the functional orthogonal convex hull of the point set. As can be seen, the orthogonal convex hull is a polygon with some degenerate "edges", namely, orthogonally convex alternating polygonal chains with interior angle  connecting extreme vertices.

Classical orthogonal convex hull 

The classical orthogonal convex hull might be disconnected. If a point set has no pair of points on a line parallel to one of the standard basis vectors, the classical orthogonal convex hull of such point set is equal to the point set itself.

This property is also valid for classical orthogonal convex hulls.

Connected orthogonal convex hull 

By definition, the connected orthogonal convex hull is always connected. However, it is not unique. Consider for example a pair of points in the plane not lying on an horizontal or a vertical line. The connected orthogonal convex hull of such points is an orthogonally convex alternating polygonal chain with interior angle  connecting the points. Any such polygonal chain has the same length, so there are infinitely many connected orthogonal convex hulls for the point set.

For point sets in the plane, the connected orthogonal convex hull can be easily obtained from the maximal orthogonal convex hull.

Functional orthogonal convex hull 

The functional orthogonal convex hull is not defined using properties of sets, but properties of functions about sets. Namely, it restricts the notion of convex function as follows. A function  is called orthogonally convex if its restriction to each line parallel to a non-zero of the standard basis vectors is a convex function.

Algorithms
Several authors have studied algorithms for constructing orthogonal convex hulls: ; ; ; . By the results of these authors, the orthogonal convex hull of  points in the plane may be constructed in time , or possibly faster using integer searching data structures for points with integer coordinates.

Related concepts
It is natural to generalize orthogonal convexity to restricted-orientation convexity, in which a set  is defined to be convex if all lines having one of a finite set of slopes must intersect  in connected subsets; see e.g.

In addition, the tight span of a finite metric space is closely related to the orthogonal convex hull. If a finite point set in the plane has a connected orthogonal convex hull, that hull is the tight span for the Manhattan distance on the point set. However, orthogonal hulls and tight spans differ for point sets with disconnected orthogonal hulls, or in higher-dimensional Lp spaces.

 describes several other results about orthogonal convexity and orthogonal visibility.

References

.
.
.
.
.
.
.
.
.
.
.
.

Convex hulls